This is a list of settlements in the province of Limburg, in the Netherlands.

References 
 GEOnet Names Server (GNS)
 Elsevier Alfabetische Plaatsnamengids van Nederland, 2006

 
Limburg